DeGraffenreid is a surname. People with the surname include:

 Emma DeGraffenreid, plaintiff of a 1976 employment discrimination lawsuit cited in the development of the theory of intersectionality
Gordon DeGraffenreid, American football coach
Kenneth E. deGraffenreid, American university professor
Reese C. De Graffenreid (1859–1902), American politician from Texas
Veronica Degraffenreid, Secretary of the Commonwealth of Pennsylvania beginning in 2021